This is a list of the candidates who ran for the Libertarian Party of Canada in the 41st Canadian federal election.

British Columbia

Ontario

See also
Results of the Canadian federal election, 2011
Libertarian Party of Canada candidates, 2008 Canadian federal election

References

 
Candidates in the 2011 Canadian federal election